Thornton Gap is a wind gap located in the Blue Ridge Mountains in Virginia separating the Shenandoah Valley from the Piedmont region of the state.

History
Thornton Gap was named for Francis Thornton (1711–April 14, 1749), owner of the land to the east and the "F.T. Valley". In 1740, he built a mansion in the Piedmont region near Nethers in Rappahannock County.

Historian J. Houston Harrison indicates in 1737 the Harrison family migrated through the Gap from Alexandria before their settlement in the valley and founding of Harrisonburg.

The privately owned Thornton's Gap Turnpike Company was formed to build a road over the mountains at Thornton's Gap. The toll road opened in 1806. 
 
Thornton Gap was one of the passages through the Blue Ridge Mountains between the Shenandoah Valley and the Piedmont region of Virginia used by Confederate General Stonewall Jackson to move his famous "foot cavalry" troops during the American Civil War.

Prior to the building of the Shenandoah National Park and the Skyline Drive by the federal Works Progress Administration (WPA) during the Great Depression, the town of Beahm was located at Thornton Gap.

Sculptor William Randolph Barbee was the son of a toll collector at Thornton Gap; his son Herbert later erected a bust in his memory at the site.

Current information

Thornton Gap is the site of the mountain crossing of U.S. Highway 211. It is located at the border of Page County and Rappahannock County. At Thornton Gap, there is an entry point for the Skyline Drive, which runs between Front Royal and the northern terminus with the Blue Ridge Parkway at Rockfish Gap. The Skyline Drive generally following the mountain ridge tops through the Shenandoah National Park, which has its headquarters near Thornton Gap in the Town of Luray. The Appalachian Trail also passes through Thornton Gap.

See also 
 Former counties, cities, and towns of Virginia

References

External links

Geographical coordinates:  (click for maps and satellite photos of Thornton Gap)
Virginia Places web site Much information about Virginia's geography

Internet
 Francis Thornton's tombstone

Wind gaps of Virginia
Blue Ridge Mountains
Mountains of Page County, Virginia
Mountains of Rappahannock County, Virginia
Shenandoah National Park